Last Love (French: Dernier amour) is a 1949 French drama film directed by Jean Stelli and starring Annabella, Georges Marchal and Jean Debucourt.

It was shot at the Billancourt Studios in Paris. The film's sets were designed by the art director Robert Hubert.

Cast
 Annabella as Hélène Fontenay 
 Georges Marchal as Alain Fontenay 
 Jean Debucourt as Le comte de Cravant 
 Jeanne Moreau as Michèle 
 Suzanne Flon as Simone 
 Jean-Pierre Kérien as Paul 
 France Asselin as La petite femme 
 Charles Bayard
 Robert Blome
 Roger Bontemps as Georges 
 André Chanu as Robert 
 Yvette Etiévant as Lina Bell 
 Luce Fabiole as L'habilleuse 
 Christian Fourcade
 Arlette Merry as La couturière 
 Marcelle Monthil as Maria

References

Bibliography 
 Dayna Oscherwitz & MaryEllen Higgins. The A to Z of French Cinema. Scarecrow Press, 2009.

External links 
 

1949 films
1949 drama films
French drama films
1940s French-language films
Films directed by Jean Stelli
Films shot at Billancourt Studios
French black-and-white films
Films based on works by Georges Ohnet
1940s French films